John Lubbock, 3rd Baron Avebury (13 May 1915 – 21 June 1971) was an English peer.

He was the son of Harold Fox Pitt Lubbock and a grandson of John Lubbock, 1st Baron Avebury. His sister, Moyra, was married to broadcaster Dorian Williams from 1938 to 1949. He succeeded his uncle, John Lubbock, 2nd Baron Avebury, as Baron Avebury in 1929.

He was married three times:
 1) Cecily Kathleen Sparrow (24 February 1938; divorced 1943)
 2) Diana Margaret Mary Westcott (31 July 1946; divorced 1955)
One daughter: Emma Rachel Lubbock (born 16 April 1952); married Michael Charles Page (23 July 1977)
 Two grand daughters: Sophie Page (born 1982) and Natasha Diana Page (born 1984)
 3) Betty Gay Ingham (22 December 1955, died 2005)

Lord Avebury died in 1971, aged 56, and was succeeded by his first cousin Eric Lubbock.

External links
Images at the National Portrait Gallery

1915 births
1971 deaths
John 3